The CHL Top Scorer Award is given out annually to the highest-scoring player in the Canadian Hockey League. It was first awarded in 1994. The winner of the CHL Top Scorer Award will be one of the recipients of the constituent league scoring champions; Jean Béliveau Trophy (QMJHL), Eddie Powers Memorial Trophy (OHL), or the Bob Clarke Trophy (WHL). The only two players to win more than once are Sidney Crosby and Conor Garland.

Winners
List of CHL Top Scorer Award recipients.

See also
 List of Canadian Hockey League awards

References

External links
 CHL Awards – CHL

Canadian Hockey League trophies and awards